The 1995 Breckland District Council election took place on 4 May 1995 to elect members of South Norfolk District Council in England. This was on the same day as other local elections.

Election result

|}

References

1995 English local elections
May 1995 events in the United Kingdom
1995
1990s in Norfolk